Modern Currencies is an album by Canadian indie rock group Uncut, released by Paper Bag Records on October 24, 2006.

Track listing
 "Dark Horse" – 5:04
 "Hideaway" – 3:26
 "New Cities" – 4:26
 "Out of Sight" – 5:37
 "Breaking Glass" – 4:06
 "Never Say Never" – 4:21
 "Kiss Me" – 3:37
 "These Times" – 3:28
 "Minus One" – 3:43
 "Chain Fight" – 3:48
 "The Night Can See" – 3:36
 "Prison Waltz" - 3:37

2006 albums
Paper Bag Records albums
Uncut (band) albums